Olteanu is a surname. Notable people with the surname include:

Adriana Nechita-Olteanu (born 1983), Romanian handball player
Bogdan Olteanu (born 1971), Romanian politician and lawyer, president of the Romanian Chamber of Deputies (2006–2008)
Gavril Olteanu, a leader of a Romanian paramilitary militia group, part of the Maniu guards during World War II
George Olteanu (born 1974), former boxer from Romania
Gheorghe Olteanu (born 1926), Romanian cross country skier
Ioana Olteanu (born 1966), Romanian rower who won three Olympic medals
Marcel Olteanu (1872–1943), Romanian general in World War I
Mihai Olteanu, Romanian football player
Olteanu, a village in Glogova Commune, Gorj County, Romania

See also
Olteanu River, a tributary of the Beliş River in Romania
Oltean

Romanian-language surnames